Strider Wildlife Management Area is a Wildlife Management Area in Montgomery County, Maryland.

External links
 Strider Wildlife Management Area

Wildlife management areas of Maryland
Protected areas of Montgomery County, Maryland